Carinator is a monotypic genus of sea snails, marine gastropod mollusks in the family Calliostomatidae within the superfamily Trochoidea, the top snails, turban snails and their allies.

Species
 †Carinator makiyamai (Ikebe, 1942)

References

 Ikebe (1942) Jap. J. Geol. Geogr., 18 (4), 279.

External links
 To World Register of Marine Species

Calliostomatidae
Monotypic gastropod genera